Tim Montez is an American college baseball coach, formerly serving as head coach of the Jacksonville Dolphins baseball team.  He assumed this position prior to the 2014 season.

Early life
Montez was a four-year letterwinner as a pitcher at Pepperdine, where he compiled a 19–11 record with three saves.  He led the Waves to the Southern California Baseball Association title in his senior season, and earned All-Conference honors.  He was a first round pick by the Mexico City Reds and played two seasons before returning to the United States.  While redshirting at Pepperdine, Montez coached at Esperanza High School, leading them to a playoff appearance and a 1.86 ERA.

Career
Montez was 1st hired by Pepperdine's Andy Lopez  as a pitching coach, where he remained for two seasons.  He returned to the high school ranks, assisting Montclair College Preparatory School for three seasons, including the 1991 CA state championship season.  Montez then spent three seasons as pitching coach at UC Santa Barbara followed by one season as pitching coach and recruiting coordinator at Cal State Northridge.  Next, he served for five seasons at Arkansas, where he served as recruiting coordinator and helped the Razorbacks to their first SEC titles and a super regional appearance.  Montez spent three seasons as pitching coach and recruiting coordinator where he helped assemble three consecutive top 15 recruiting classes on the West Coast at Fresno State before moving to Jacksonville for his first collegiate head coaching position. At Jacksonville Montez was part of 4 NCAA Regionals and 3 Conference Championships. Overall, Montez has coached in 9 NCAA Regionals and 1 Super Regional. Montez has coached several 1st round draft picks and numerous MLB players such as Russ Ortiz, Michael Young, Cliff Lee, Matt Garza, Doug Fister...  Montez is known for his legendary "ikik" to get his players attention.

Head coaching record
The following is a table of Montez's yearly records as an NCAA head coach.

See also
 List of current NCAA Division I baseball coaches

References

Living people
Baseball pitchers
Arkansas Razorbacks baseball coaches
Cal State Northridge Matadors baseball coaches
Fresno State Bulldogs baseball coaches
Jacksonville Dolphins baseball coaches
Pepperdine Waves baseball coaches
Pepperdine Waves baseball players
UC Santa Barbara Gauchos baseball coaches
High school baseball coaches in the United States
People from Whittier, California
1961 births